On 16 November 1937 a Junkers Ju 52/3m owned by Belgian airline SABENA, operating as a scheduled international passenger flight from Munich, Germany, to London, England, crashed near Ostend, Belgium. The aircraft hit a tall factory chimney while attempting to land at Stene aerodrome near Ostend, Belgium. The accident killed prominent members of the Hesse royal family on the way to London for the wedding of Louis, Prince of Hesse and by Rhine.

Accident
The flight from Munich to London was scheduled to stop at Frankfurt, Brussels and Ostend Airport but diverted to Stene Aerodrome due to bad weather. The aircraft hit the chimney of a brick factory and crashed, bursting into flames.

All eleven passengers and crew who boarded the aircraft died. The remains of Grand Duchess Cecilie's newborn son were found among the wreckage; a Belgian official enquiry into the crash concluded that she had given birth during the flight and that the birth was the reason the pilot was attempting to land despite the poor weather conditions.

Crew and passengers

Crew: 
 Antoine Lambotte, pilot
 Philippe Courtois, wireless operator
 Yvan Lansmans, mechanic

Passengers:
Georg Donatus, Hereditary Grand Duke of Hesse
Cecilie, Hereditary Grand Duchess of Hesse
Prince Ludwig of Hesse
Prince Alexander of Hesse
Georg Donatus' and Cecilie's newborn son
Eleonore, Grand Duchess of Hesse
 Joachim Riedesel zu Eisenbach, friend of the grand ducal family
 , world-record setting glider pilot and friend of the grand ducal family
 Sister Lina Hahn, governess of the grand ducal family

Aircraft
The aircraft was a three-engined Junkers Ju 52/3m airliner operated by SABENA and registered in Belgium as OO-AUB.

Aftermath
The wedding of Prince Louis with Margaret Campbell Geddes, daughter of Sir Auckland Geddes was brought forward to the morning after the accident. Baron Riedesel would have been Louis' best man; their friend Oliver Chesterton stood in as best man; the ceremony was small and solemn with the guests in mourning clothes.

Immediately following the wedding, Prince Louis and his wife Margaret travelled to Belgium and visited a hospital where the victims' bodies had been laid out.

The Hereditary Grand Duke and Duchess' fourteen-month-old daughter, Johanna, was the only one of the family who was not on board the aircraft. She was adopted by her uncle Louis in early 1938. Johanna died of meningitis in 1939.

With the death of the childless Prince Louis in 1968, the male line of the Hesse and by Rhine became extinct.

The crash and its effect on Cecilie's younger brother, Philip, were featured in season 2 of the Netflix series, The Crown. However, this fictionalised version wrongly implied that Philip was to blame for Cecilie taking the flight, whereas in reality "her decision to travel to London had nothing to do with Philip".

See also
 Aviation safety
 List of accidents and incidents involving commercial aircraft

Notes

References

Bibliography 
Duff, David. Hessian Tapestry. David & Charles PLC, 1979.

External links
 Photo of the crash

Sabena accidents and incidents
Accidents and incidents involving the Junkers Ju 52
Airliner accidents and incidents caused by weather
Aviation accidents and incidents in Belgium
Aviation accidents and incidents in 1937
Ostend
1937 in Belgium
1937 meteorology